James Nisbet (27 August 1904 – 18 November 1964) was a Scottish footballer who played as a right winger.

Born in Glenbuck, Nisbet played club football for Glenbuck Athletic, Cumnock Juniors, Ayr United and Dalbeattie Star, and made three appearances for Scotland in 1929.

References

1904 births
1964 deaths
Scottish footballers
Footballers from East Ayrshire
Scotland international footballers
Glenbuck Cherrypickers F.C. players
Ayr United F.C. players
Cumnock Juniors F.C. players
Dalbeattie Star F.C. players
Scottish Football League players
Scottish Junior Football Association players
Association football outside forwards